Kamaluddin Mohammed Majeed, mononymously known as Kamal, is an Indian film director, screenwriter, and producer who predominantly works in the Malayalam cinema. He was the former Chairman of Kerala State Chalachitra Academy. Kamal made his directorial debut with the 1986 film Mizhineerppoovukal. In a career spanning over three decades, Kamal has directed over forty films. His films have won various National Film Awards and Kerala State Film Awards, including films such as  Ulladakkam (1991), Mazhayethum Munpe (1995), Niram (1999), Madhuranombarakkattu (2000),  Meghamalhar (2001), Nammal (2002), Perumazhakkalam (2004), Karutha Pakshikal (2006), and Celluloid  (2013).

Personal life 
Kamal was born on 28 November 1957 in Kodungallur, as the eldest son of late K.M. Abdul Majeed and late Suleikhabi. He has two younger brothers. He is married to his first cousin Saburabi. They have two children, Jenuse Mohamed and Hanna Shanu. Jenuse made his debut as film director in 2015 with the Malayalam film 100 Days of Love.

In April 2020, reports surfaced that an aspiring Mollywood actress had sent the director a legal notice on 26 April 2019, accusing him of sexually assaulting her after promising a role in his film. Kamal said he suspected a former Chalachitra Academy employee to be behind the recent expose and termed the allegations baseless and intended to defame him.

Career
He started his career by writing the film Thrasam, directed by Padiyan in 1981. He also worked as an associate director in the film.

His first film was Mizhineer Pookkal in 1986 and to date, he has directed more than 43 movies, among which are two non-Malayalam movies, one each in Tamil and Hindi. Apart from his role as a director, Kamal has held several administrative posts within the Malayalam film industry. He had previously acted as the general secretary of Malayalam Cine Technicians Association  (MACTA) and has been an executive member of the Kerala Chalachitra Academy. He is currently the President of the Kerala Director's Union (FEFKA).

His works include Unnikale Oru Katha Parayam, Kakkothikavile Appooppan Thadikal, Thoovalsparsham, Ghazal, Ulladakam, Ee Puzhayam Kadannu, Azhagiya Ravanan, Mazhayethum Munpe, Meghamalhar, Madhuranombarakaattu, Perumazhakkalam, Karutha Pakshikal, Khaddama and Celluloid. His interest in film-making led him to enroll at the Kalabharathi Film Institute in Thrissur.

Celluloid (2013) is the biopic of J.C Daniel, the father of Malayalam cinema.  Smitha at the entertainment site oneindia.com stated that the film is one of the best films made in recent times from Indian cinema.

Aami is a biopic of poet and author Kamala Surayya.

Filmography

As director

As producer

As Associate Director

Dialogues

Story

Awards and nominations

National Film Awards
 2005– Best Film on Other Social Issues for Perumazhakkalam
 2007– Best Film on Family Welfare for Karutha Pakshikal
 2013– Best Feature Film in Malayalam for Celluloid

Kerala State Film Award
 1991 Best Director for Ulladakkam
 1995 Best Popular Film for Mazhayethum Munpe
 2000 Second Best Feature Film for Madhuranombarakkattu
 2001 Second Best Feature Film for Meghamalhar
 2001 Best Screen Play for Meghamalhar
 2002 Best Popular Film for Nammal
 2013 Best Film for Celluloid

Kerala Film Critics Association Awards
 1995 Second Best Film for Mazhayethum Munpe
 1996 Second Best Film for Ee Puzhayum Kadannu
 1999 Second Best Film for Niram
 2001 Best Film for Meghamalhar
 2002 Second Best Film for Nammal
 2004 Best Film for Perumazhakkalam
 2004 Best Director for Perumazhakkalam
 2006 Best Film for Karutha Pakshikal
 2006 Best Director for Karutha Pakshikal
 2010 Best Film for Khaddama
 2010 Best Director for Khaddama
 2012 Best Film for Celluloid
 2012 Best Director for Celluloid

Asianet Film Awards
 2001: Asianet Film Award for Best Director- Meghamalhar

References

External links

 
 Kamal's memoirs serialised in Madhyamam Weekly: 1, 2, 3, 4, 5, 6, 7, 8, 9 

Living people
Malayalam film directors
People from Thrissur district
Film directors from Thrissur
Film producers from Thrissur
20th-century Indian film directors
21st-century Indian film directors
Writers from Thrissur
20th-century Indian dramatists and playwrights
21st-century Indian dramatists and playwrights
Malayalam screenwriters
Screenwriters from Kerala
Directors who won the Best Film on Family Welfare National Film Award
Directors who won the Best Film on Other Social Issues National Film Award
Male actors from Thrissur
1957 births